Meyer Swanepoel (born 7 May 1989 in Bellville, Western Cape, South Africa) is a South African rugby union player, who most recently played with . His regular position is flanker or eighth man.

Rugby career

Western Province (youth)

He attended Paul Roos Gymnasium in Stellenbosch, where he rugby and earned provincial selection to represent  at the Under-16 Grant Khomo Week in 2005 and the Under-18 Academy Week in 2007. After finishing high school, Swanepoel and Paul Roos Gynmasium captain Lambert Groenewald both moved to Durban to join the  academy.

Sharks

Swanepoel started eight of the  team's matches in the 2008 Under-19 Provincial Championship, scoring a try against , and three of the  team's matches in the 2009 Under-21 Provincial Championship.

The Sharks won nine of their matches during the regular season to finish in third position on the log, but a third defeat to the Blue Bulls U21 team in the semi-final saw them eliminated from the competition.

Maties

Swanepoel failed to break into the ' Currie Cup squad and returned to Stellenbosch to represent their university side, in the 2011 Varsity Cup competition. Despite winning the first three editions of the competition in 2008, 2009 and 2010, Maties struggled in the 2011 edition and finished in fifth position, missing out on a semi-final spot, with Swanepoel making six appearances.

Mogliano

Swanepoel then moved to Italy, where he was contracted by National Championship of Excellence side Mogliano prior to the 2011–2012 season. He played in sixteen of their eighteen matches during the regular season – starting fourteen of those – and scored five tries to help Mogliano finish in third spot. He also started both legs of their semi-final against I Cavalieri, but an 18–16 victory in the second leg wasn't enough to overturn their 24–29 first leg defeat and they failed to progress to the final.

He scored three tries in nineteen appearances during the 2012–2013 regular season, helping Mogliano to finish in fourth position to again qualify for the semi-finals. He started all their matches in the play-offs; an 18–8 victory over table-toppers Viadana in the semi-final first leg proved crucial as Mogliano qualified for the final despite a 6–13 defeat in the second leg. Swanepoel played the full 80 minutes of the final as they avenged their semi-final defeat to I Cavalieri the previous season by winning 16–11 to win their first ever Italian title. In addition to the Italian league, Mogliano's semi-final spot in 2011–2012 also saw them qualify for the 2012–13 European Challenge Cup. Swanepoel featured in all six of their matches in the competition, but a torrid season saw them losing all six of their matches, scoring just four tries and conceding 52.

Swanepoel remained a regular for Mogliano in 2013–2014 as they sought to defend their title; he scored two tries in twenty appearances during the season, as they once again finished in the top four to qualify for the semi-finals, before being eliminated by Rovigo after losing in both legs of the semi-final. Swanepoel also featured in five of their matches in the 2013–14 European Challenge Cup, where they once again lost all six of their matches.

Benetton Treviso

During his final season at Mogliano, Swanepoel was also drafted into the Benetton Treviso squad during their Pro12 campaign. He made his Pro12 debut in their Round Thirteen match against Welsh side Scarlets and also marked the occasion with his first try eleven minutes from time in a 33–41 defeat. Swanepoel featured in two more matches during the season – against the Ospreys and Ulster – as his side finished in eleventh spot on the table.

He earned a permanent contract with Benetton Treviso for the 2014–15 Pro12 season and made fourteen appearances for his side, five of those being starts. In addition, he also played in the European Rugby Champions Cup for the first time; he made four appearances, playing in both legs against Racing Métro 92 and in defeats to the Ospreys and the Northampton Saints.

Western Province

Swanepoel was released by Benetton Treviso at the end of the 2014–2015 season and he returned to South Africa.

References

1989 births
Living people
Rugby union flankers
Rugby union number eights
Rugby union players from Bellville, South Africa
Sharks (Currie Cup) players
South African rugby union players
Western Province (rugby union) players